The Little Caesars Pizza Bowl (known as the Motor City Bowl until 2009) was a post-season college football bowl game that was played annually from 1997 to 2013. The first five games (1997–2001) were played at the Pontiac Silverdome in Pontiac, Michigan, and moved to the 65,000-seat Ford Field in downtown Detroit, Michigan in 2002—the past and present homes of the Detroit Lions respectively. The game marked the first bowl game held in the Detroit area since the Cherry Bowl in 1984–85.

The Little Caesars Pizza Bowl featured a bowl-eligible team from the Mid-American Conference (usually the winner of the MAC Championship Game, although that team was not required to accept the bid; prior to the formation of the bowl the MAC champion earned an automatic bid to the Las Vegas Bowl) playing a bowl-eligible team from the Big Ten Conference. If the Big Ten did not have an eligible team, the game featured a team from the Sun Belt Conference that met the NCAA requirement of at least six wins. In the event that the Sun Belt did not have an available team, an at-large team could be chosen.

The final Little Caesars Pizza Bowl was held in 2013; it was displaced by the Quick Lane Bowl, which is organized by the Detroit Lions and also features Big Ten and MAC opponents (though the ACC served as the Big Ten's opponent through 2019). Organizers explored the possibility of moving the Little Caesars Pizza Bowl to nearby Comerica Park as an outdoor game, but the game would instead be cancelled.

History
The Motor City Bowl started in 1997 at the Pontiac Silverdome.

The game was jointly sponsored by the "Big Three" automakers in Detroit from 1998 to 2007 (Ford, General Motors and Chrysler). Starting with the 2008 game, Chrysler was replaced by the Michigan Regional Council of Carpenters and Millwrights as a presenting sponsor.  In 2009, Little Caesars became the title sponsor of the game after General Motors and Chrysler reorganized under bankruptcy protection.  Ford remained as a sponsor. In 2011, the three automakers, along with the UAW, began contributing $100,000 jointly to become presenting sponsors of the game.

A bowl record crowd of 60,624 fans witnessed the 2007 bowl game between the Purdue Boilermakers and the Central Michigan Chippewas.

On April 12, 2010, it was announced that the Big Ten Conference had extended its affiliation with the Little Caesars Pizza Bowl (Big Ten no. 8) through the 2013 season. Also the Sun Belt Conference agreed to a secondary tie-in that would allow a Sun Belt Conference team to play in the Detroit-based game should the Big Ten Conference not have an available bowl-eligible team to play.

In August 2013, the Detroit Lions announced that it would hold a new bowl game at Ford Field beginning in 2014, between the Big Ten and an Atlantic Coast Conference (ACC) opponent. While Pizza Bowl organizers attempted to move the bowl to Comerica Park (which is owned by Little Caesars' parent company Ilitch Holdings) and convert it to an outdoor game, these plans never came to fruition.

In August 2014, the Lions announced that the new game would be known as the Quick Lane Bowl, and that it would be held on the same day—December 26—that the Little Caesars Pizza Bowl was traditionally held on. In a statement to Crain's Detroit Business, Motor City Bowl executive director Ken Hoffman confirmed that "there is no Pizza Bowl for 2014. We will have to see about the future", implying that the game has been cancelled indefinitely in favor of the Quick Lane Bowl. The MAC holds a secondary tie-in for the Quick Lane Bowl.

Game results

MVPs

Appearances by team
There were 17 playings of the bowl (34 total appearances).
Teams with multiple appearances

Teams with a single appearance
Won: Boston College, Connecticut, Florida Atlantic, FIU, Memphis, Mississippi, Pittsburgh

Loss: Akron, BYU, Louisville, Middle Tennessee, Northwestern, Ohio, Western Kentucky, Western Michigan

Appearances by conference

See also
 List of Little Caesars Pizza Bowl broadcasters

References

External links
 

 
Defunct college football bowls
Sports in Pontiac, Michigan
Recurring sporting events established in 1997
1997 establishments in Michigan
Recurring sporting events disestablished in 2013
2013 disestablishments in Michigan
American football in Michigan